The 1996 Campeonato Argentino de Rugby   was won with a shared victory by the selection of Buenos Aires and Cordoba.

Rugby Union in Argentina in 1996

International 
 In June, France toured Argentina, winning two test match against the "Pumas" and all the other match

 Before to visit Europe, South Africa toured Argentina. The Springboks played and won four match, four of them against "Pumas".
 In late November The "Pumas" toured England. The Pumas won all the match against regional selection and lost only against England "A" and the England first team

 "The Pumas" won the second edition of Pan American Championship

National 
 The "Campeonato Argentino Menores de 21" (Under 21 championship) was won by Buenos Aires
 The "Campeonato Argentino Menores de 19" (Under 19 championship) victory was shared by Buenos Aires and Tucumàn
 The "National Championship for clubs" was won by Hindú
 The "Torneo de la URBA" (Buenos Aires) was won by Hindú and Atlético del Rosario
 The "Cordoba Province Championship" was won by Córdoba AC
 The North-East Championship was won by Natación y Gimnasia

"Campeonato" 
For the first time were played a single round robin with 6 teams 

Relegated: San Juan

Zone "Ascenso" 
 Results

 Ranking Final

Promoted: Mar del Plata
Relegated: Sur

Zone "Promocional"

Pool A

Pool B 

The Pool B was not completed

External links 
 Memorias de la UAR 1996
  Francesco Volpe, Paolo Pacitti (Author), Rugby 2000, GTE Gruppo Editorale (1999)

Campeonato Argentino de Rugby
Argentina